Henri-Camille Marcel called Henry Marcel, (25 November 1854 – 6 March 1926) was a 19th–20th-century French senior official, general administrator of the Bibliothèque nationale de France from 1905 to 1913.

In October 1903, he succeeded Henry Roujon at the head of the École nationale supérieure des beaux-arts of Paris.

In 1905, he was appointed general administrator of the Bibliothèque nationale after Léopold Delisle.

In May 1913, he became head of the Réunion des musées nationaux, until 1919.

In February 1899, he married Laure Meyer (first daughter of banker Maurice Meyer) with whom he had a son, philosopher and playwright Gabriel Marcel. After Laure's premature death, he married Berthe Meyer, sister of the former.

References

External links 
 Henry Marcel on data.bnf.fr
 Thèse d'Hortense Dufour (Sorbonne) sur la carrière d'Henry Marcel

Directors of museums in France
Directors of the Louvre
1854 births
1926 deaths